Kristoffer Gunnarshaug (born 11 May 1999) is a Norwegian football midfielder who plays for Ullensaker/Kisa.

References

1999 births
Living people
People from Haugesund
Norwegian footballers
SK Haugar players
FK Haugesund players
Eliteserien players
Association football midfielders
Sportspeople from Rogaland